Phyllopodium is a genus of flowering plants belonging to the family Scrophulariaceae.

Its native range is Southern Africa.

Species
Species:

Phyllopodium alpinum 
Phyllopodium anomalum 
Phyllopodium bracteatum 
Phyllopodium caespitosum 
Phyllopodium capillare 
Phyllopodium cephalophorum 
Phyllopodium collinum 
Phyllopodium cordatum 
Phyllopodium cuneifolium 
Phyllopodium diffusum 
Phyllopodium dolomiticum 
Phyllopodium elegans 
Phyllopodium heterophyllum 
Phyllopodium hispidulum 
Phyllopodium lupuliforme 
Phyllopodium maxii 
Phyllopodium micranthum 
Phyllopodium mimetes 
Phyllopodium multifolium 
Phyllopodium namaense 
Phyllopodium phyllopodioides 
Phyllopodium pubiflorum 
Phyllopodium pumilum 
Phyllopodium rustii 
Phyllopodium tweedense 
Phyllopodium viscidissimum

References

Scrophulariaceae
Scrophulariaceae genera